The 1972 United States presidential election in Nebraska took place on November 7, 1972, as part of the 1972 United States presidential election. Voters chose five representatives, or electors, to the Electoral College, who voted for president and vice president.

Nebraska was won by incumbent President Richard Nixon (R–California), with 70.5% of the popular vote, against George McGovern (D–South Dakota), with 29.5% of the popular vote.

In a state that would reflect McGovern's national results, the Democratic nominee did not win a single county in Nebraska. Out of Nixon's three campaigns, this was the only one in which Nebraska was not his strongest state, although he did outperform his past two performances here in popular vote percentage. Instead, Nebraska was his seventh strongest state after Mississippi, Georgia, Oklahoma, Alabama, Florida, and South Carolina.

Results

Results by county

See also
 United States presidential elections in Nebraska

References

Nebraska
1972
1972 Nebraska elections